A sideman is a musician who performs live with a band of which they are not a permanent member.

Sideman or Sidemen may also refer to:
 Sidemen, Bali, a district in the Karangasem Regency of Bali
 Sideman (bishop), a 10th-century Bishop of Crediton, modern Exeter
 Side Man, a play by Warren Leight, finalist for the 1999 Pulitzer Prize for Drama
 Sidemen (YouTube group), a group of British YouTubers

See also
 Sidesman, a term related to churches